This is a list of short stories by American writer Isaac Asimov. Asimov is principally known for his science fiction, but he also wrote mystery and fantasy stories.

This list includes Asimov's Foundation short stories, which were later collected into three novels known as the Foundation Trilogy.

Published stories

In this table, "year" refers to the year of publication, and in the case of magazines means the cover date (which is not always the year when the magazine actually appeared on sale). Alternative titles appear in brackets. (383 stories appear on this list.)

The collection I, Robot also contains a linking text at the beginning and end of the book, and in between some (but not all) of the stories, which form a framing story not found anywhere else.

A play by Asimov called The Story Machine, which is an adaptation of his short story "Someday", was published in the February 1958 issue of Plays.

In 1950 Asimov wrote a comic strip called "Star Empire" (art by Charles Schneeman). The first page appeared in the May 1990 issue of Argosy.

Stories never anthologised

Five published stories were never included in Asimov's own books. They were however included in other anthologies. These were "Half-Baked Publisher's Delight" (1974), "Getting Even" (1980), "The Turning Point" (1988), "The Lost Dog" (1988) and "Ho! Ho! Ho!" (1989).

Nine science fiction stories have never been collected in any book:
"Question" (Computers and Automation, March 1955) had an ending which was similar to another author's 1952 story (although the rest of the story was different), and when this was pointed out to Asimov he promised never to publish it again, a promise he kept. By that time the story had already been reprinted in the April 30, 1957, issue of Science World.
"The Portable Star" (Thrilling Wonder Stories, Winter 1955) was Asimov's least favourite story, and was anthologised without his permission in a magazine, A Treasury of Great Science Fiction Stories no. 1 (1964). (It has since been reprinted in Thrilling Wonder Stories, Summer 2007.)
"A Woman's Heart" (Satellite, June 1957) was never collected because of Asimov's disdain for it.
"The Covenant" (Fantastic Story Magazine, July 1960) was a five-part round-robin story to which five different authors contributed. Asimov wrote the second part. (It was reprinted in a magazine in 1966, Most Thrilling Science Fiction Ever Told Number 2.)
"The Man Who Made the 21st Century" (Boys' Life, October 1965)
"Party by Satellite" (The Saturday Evening Post, May 1974) (Original title "The Third Dream.")
"Strike!" (Omni, January 1979) (reprinted in the magazine The Best of Omni Science Fiction No. 4)
"The Super Runner" (Runner's World, October 1982)
"The Ten-Second Election" (Omni, November 1984)

20 mystery stories have also never been anthologised. Of these, all but one are Union Club mystery stories (for a list, see The Union Club Mysteries). "Zip Code" (1986) is a mystery story featuring the boy detective character Larry.

Unpublished stories

Nine stories which Asimov wrote early in his career were never published anywhere, and are now lost. They were:
 (1938) "Cosmic Corkscrew" (9,000 words)
 (1938) "This Irrational Planet" (3,000 words)
 (1938) "Paths of Destiny" (6,000 words)
 (1938) "Knossos in Its Glory" (6,000 words)
 (1939) "The Decline and Fall" (6,000 words)
 (1939) "Life Before Birth" (6,000 words)
 (1939) "The Brothers" (6,000 words)
 (1940) "The Oak" (6,000 words)
 (1941) "Masks" (1,500 words)

In the 1972 anthology The Early Asimov, Asimov listed two other stories which he thought had also been lost: "The Weapon" (1938) and "Big Game" (1941). However, they were subsequently found ("The Weapon" had in fact been published under a pseudonym in 1942, which Asimov had forgotten). They were collected in In Memory Yet Green (1979) and Before the Golden Age (1974), respectively. (They are included in the above list of published stories.)

In his autobiography, Asimov wrote "Since February 1941, I have never written a piece of fiction that has not, in one way or another, seen print."

See also
 Isaac Asimov book series bibliography
 Isaac Asimov bibliography

References

External links
 Asimovonline.com
 Susan Stepney (collates stories to collections)
 
 Storypilot (1938–1952) and 1953–1995
 Asimovreviews.net

Bibliographies by writer
 
Bibliographies of American writers
Lists of stories
Science fiction bibliographies